Brattegardia is a monotypic genus of calcareous sponge with a single species: Brattegardia nanseni from Norway. The genus is named after the Norwegian marine biologist Torleiv Brattegard. The species is named after Norwegian helminthologist Fridtjof Nansen.

Description
Calcinea in which the cormus is formed by anastomosed tubes covered by a thin membranous layer, at least in young specimens. Cormus is massive/globular with or without a stalk. The skeleton contains regular (equiangular and equiradiant) triactines and tetractines, but parasagittal triactines may be present. Triactines are the most numerous spicules. Aquiferous system asconoid.

See also

 Sponge

References

Clathrinidae
Sponge genera